Kitturiaq is a 2013 Canadian documentary film by Frank Wolf that follows two friends on a remote 620 km wilderness canoe journey over the vast Labrador Plateau.  Set in the Inuit/Innu regions of Nunatsiavut and Nunavik, the film shares the cultural perspectives of local people in the context of the journey. The film airs on CBC's documentary (TV channel) in Canada and features music by Patrick Watson, Half Moon Run, The Cyrillic Typewriter, Wintermitts, Boucan Sound System, and throat singers Sylvia Cloutier and Madeleine Allakariallak.

External links

Canoeroots Magazine cover feature
Canadian Geographic Magazine article on film
Official Film Website

2013 television films
2013 films
2013 documentary films
Canadian documentary films
Documentary films about canoeing
Films directed by Frank Wolf
Films shot in Newfoundland and Labrador
Labrador
2010s Canadian films